Van de Wiel or Van der Wiel is a Dutch toponymic surname meaning "from the wiel". A wiel is a pool or small lake formed by a dyke breach. Some of the variants (with # of people in 2007 in the Netherlands and in 2008 in Belgium) are Van de Wiel (3615, 195), Van der Wiel (2082, 42), Van de Wiele (40, 1522), Vandewiele (0, 1132), Van der Wiele (211, 7), and Van der Wielen (2323, 159). Notable people with these surnames include:

Van de Wiel
Ad van de Wiel (born 1959), Dutch footballer
Anouk van de Wiel (born 1992), Dutch handball player
Jolijn van de Wiel (born 1992), Dutch actress
Mark van de Wiel (born 1958), English clarinettist
Willy van de Wiel (born 1982), Dutch darts player
Van der Wiel
Gregory van der Wiel (born 1988), Dutch footballer
Jan van der Wiel (1892–1962), Dutch fencer
John van der Wiel (born 1959), Dutch chess grandmaster
 (1893–1960), Dutch racing cyclist
Van der Wielen
 (born 1991), Dutch long-distance runner
Suzan van der Wielen (born 1971), Dutch field hockey player

See also
Van de Wiele
Van der Weele

References

Dutch-language surnames
Dutch toponymic surnames
Surnames of Dutch origin